Laura Jurd (born 1990) is a musician and composer from Hampshire, United Kingdom. She plays trumpet and synthesizer. She has released albums as a solo artist, and she plays in a jazz quartet named Dinosaur, whose album Together, As One was nominated for the Mercury Prize in 2017.

Jurd teaches composition at Trinity Laban Conservatoire of Music and Dance in London. Jurd composes for and plays in British jazz quartet Dinosaur.

Awards and honors
Jurd is a member of BBC Radio 3's New Generation Artists. She won 'Instrumentalist of the Year' in the 2015 Parliamentary Jazz Award, the Worshipful Company of Musicians' Dankworth Prize for Jazz Composition in 2011 and Young Jazz Musician award in 2012. She was shortlisted for a BASCA Contemporary Jazz Composer award in 2012.

Discography
 Landing Ground (2012)
 Human Spirit (2015)
 Together, As One with Dinosaur (2016)
 Wonder Trail with Dinosaur (2018)
 Stepping Back, Jumping In (2019)
 To The Earth with Dinosaur (2020)

References

Living people
1990 births
British jazz keyboardists
British jazz trumpeters
Women jazz musicians
Musicians from Hampshire
21st-century trumpeters
21st-century British women musicians
Dinosaur (band) members
Edition Records artists
Women trumpeters
People from Medstead